Prorocopis euxantha, the golden crest, is a moth of the family Noctuidae. The species was first described by Oswald Bertram Lower in 1902. It is found in most of Australia.

The wingspan is about 30 mm.

References

Catocalinae